During the 1993–94 English football season, Watford F.C. competed in the Football League First Division.

Season summary
In July 1993, after Steve Perryman left to join Tottenham Hotspur, Roeder was hired as Watford's new manager at the start of the 1993–94 season. However, Watford were fined £10,000 for an illegal approach, and ordered to pay Gillingham a further £30,000 in compensation.

Watford endured a poor season and came nowhere near to mounting a serious promotion challenge which at one stage produced just 4 wins from 20 league games, picking up just 16 points out of 60 during that run which also included 7 defeats in 8 games. As a result of their poor form, they were involved in a relegation battle and at that stage just ahead of the relegation zone on goals scored, and their form didn't improve heading to the closing stages of the season and again lost 7 from 8 games between 5 February and 19 March which saw the Hornets in the relegation zone and looked set for the drop but their final 10 games saw Watford win six to secure survival for another season in Division One.

Final league table

Results
Watford's score comes first

Legend

Football League First Division

FA Cup

League Cup

Anglo-Italian Cup

Players

First-team squad
Squad at end of season

Left club during season

References

Notes

Watford F.C. seasons
Watford